Dean is a small farming & forestry community in the North Branch Musquodoboit in the Musquodoboit Valley  along the Halifax Regional Municipality/Colchester County county line, in the Canadian province of Nova Scotia, along Route 336. Other communities in the North Branch include Elmsvale, Greenwood, Upper Musquodoboit, and Moose River Gold Mines, among others.

Transportation
Route 336 runs north–south through Dean. The only other major road in the community is Woodside Rd, which leads to Trafalgar, in neighboring Guysborough County. There are other minor gravel/dirt roads in Dean.

Communications
Telephone exchange 902 - 568
Postal code - B0N 2M0

Navigator

External links
Explore HRM

Communities in Halifax, Nova Scotia
General Service Areas in Nova Scotia